The 1999 WNBA season was the 3rd season for the Sacramento Monarchs.  The Monarchs made their first postseason appearance but lost to the Los Angeles Sparks in the first round.

Offseason

WNBA Draft

Regular season

Season standings

Season schedule

References

Sacramento Monarchs seasons
Sacramento
Sacramento Monarchs